Cornelia is a feminine given name. It is a feminine form of the name Cornelius or Cornelis. Nel, Nele, Nelly, Corey, Lia, or Nelia can be used as a shortened version of Cornelia (or Helen or Eleanor). Conny, Connie, Nele, or Neele are popular German short forms used in their own right. Lia and Cokkie are diminutive versions of the Dutch name.

In Ancient Rome, Cornelia was the name of the women born in all the branches of the Cornelii family. For a list of the notable Roman women, see: Cornelia (gens).

It is the alternate spelling of Kornelia, Korneliya, and Cornélia.

Historical women with the name 

Cornelia Africana, mother of the Gracchi
Cornelia, first wife of Julius Caesar
Cornelia, a Christian saint martyred with Anesius
Cornelia Metella ( 73 BCE –  48 BCE), daughter of Metellus Scipio
Cornelia Salonina (died 268), wife of Roman Emperor Gallienus
Cornelia van Cortlandt, the mother of General Philip Schuyler and grandmother of Angelica, and Eliza, the wife of General Alexander Hamilton, 1st Secretary of the Treasury, a Founding Father, as well as others.

Modern women with the name 

Cornelia Lister (born 1994), Swedish tennis player
Cornelia Bargmann (born 1961), American neurobiologist
Cornelia "Conny" van Bentum (born 1965), Dutch swimmer
Cornelia "Corrie" ten Boom (1892–1983), Dutch World War II resistance member
Cornelia "Kea" Bouman (1903–1998), Dutch tennis player
Cornelia Bürki (born 1953), Swiss long-distance runner
Cornelia Brandolini d'Adda (born 1979), Italian fashion director
Cornelia Clapp (1849–1934), American zoologist and marine biologist
Cornelia Denz (born 1963), German physicist
Cornelia Hubertina "Neel" Doff (1858–1942), Dutch-Belgian writer
Cornelia Dow (1842–1905), American philanthropist, temperance activist
Cornelia Druţu, Romanian mathematician
Cornelia Dumler (born 1982), German volleyball player 
Cornelia Elgood (1874 – 1960), British physician 
Cornelia Emilian (1840-1910), Romanian women's activist
Cornelia Frances (1941-2018), English-Australian actress
Cornelia Froboess (born 1943), German actress and singer 
Cornelia Funke (born 1958), German children's writer
Cornelia Deaderick Glenn (1854–1926), First Lady of North Carolina
Cornelia Nycke Groot (born 1988), Dutch handball player
Cornelia Hanisch (born 1952), German fencer
Cornelia Collins Hussey (1827–1902), American philanthropist, writer 
Cornelia Hütter (born 1992), Austrian alpine skier
Cornelia Jane Matthews Jordan (1830–1898), American poet, lyricist
Cornelia "Corrie" Laddé (1915–1996), Dutch swimmer
Cornelia Catharina de Lange (1871–1950), Dutch pediatrician
Cornelia F. Maury (1866–1942), American pastel artist
Cornelia van Marle (1661–1699), Dutch painter
Cornelia van Meijgaard (1913–2010), Dutch actress, singer, and cabaretière known as "Conny Stuart"
Cornelia van der Mijn (1709–1782), Dutch lower painter
Cornelia "Cora" van Nieuwenhuizen (born 1963), Dutch politician, MEP
Cornelia van Nijenroode (1629–c.1692), Dutch merchant in the Dutch East Indies
Cornelia "Keetie" van Oosten-Hage (born 1949), Dutch cyclist
Cornelia Oschkenat (born 1961), East German hurdler
Cornelia Parker (born 1956), British artist
Cornelia Polit (born 1963), East German backstroke swimmer
Cornelia "Conny" Pröll (born 1961), Austrian alpine skier
Cornelia de Rijck (1653–1726), Dutch painter
Cornelia Scheffer (1769–1839), Dutch painter and portrait miniaturist
Cornélia Scheffer (1830-1899), French designer and sculptor, grand-daughter of the former
Cornelia Schlosser (1750–1777), sister of Johann von Goethe
Cornelia Otis Skinner (1899–1979), American actress, humorist, and playwright
Cornelia Sollfrank (born 1960), German digital artist and early pioneer of Net Art and cyberfeminism
Cornelia Laws St. John (died 1902), American poet 
Cornelia Strong (1877–1955), American mathematician and astronomer
Cornelia Tăutu (1938–2019), Romanian composer
Cornelia Toppen (1730–1800), Dutch Orangist and the instigator of the 1784 riots of Rotterdam
Cornelia van der Veer (1639–?), Dutch poet
W. Cornelia "Cornélie" van Zanten (1855–1946), Dutch opera singer, singing teacher and author

Fictional characters

Cornelia Hale, the Guardian of Earth in the W.i.t.c.h. comics and cancelled TV series; third member of the second generation of Guardians of the Veil
Blair Cornelia Waldorf, a fictional character in the TV-series Gossip Girl
Cornelia li Britannia, a fictional character in the anime series Code Geass
Cornelia, fictional character from the book and film Sune's Summer

References

See also
Cornelia (disambiguation), for other meanings of Cornelia
Cornelia (gens), for a list of the notable Roman women in the Cornelii family
 Cornelis, the Dutch masculine version of the name
Cornelius (name), a masculine form of the name
Kornelia, a similarly spelled and pronounced name

Given names
Feminine given names
Dutch feminine given names
German feminine given names
Latin feminine given names
Romanian feminine given names